The Volkswagen Fox is a subcompact car produced and designed by Volkswagen of Brazil and sold in Latin America from 2003 until 2021 and in Europe from 2005 until 2011, where it was sold as the city car offering. The Fox was produced as a 3-door and 5-door hatchback. There is also a mini SUV version called Fox Xtreme (previously CrossFox) and a mini MPV/station wagon model called Suran, SpaceFox, SportVan or Fox Plus depending on the market.

Earlier use of the nameplate
Volkswagen acquired the rights to the name in 1969, by purchasing NSU. The original NSU Fox was a motorbike first seen in 1949, and Volkswagen had subsequently used the "Fox" name in some markets for special edition Volkswagen Polos. The Audi 80 produced in the 1970s also used the name Fox on vehicles sold in Australia and the United States. The Australian version was assembled locally by Volkswagen Australasia Ltd.

North America (1987–1993)

The Fox was a variant of the Gol manufactured by Volkswagen do Brasil and marketed by Volkswagen in North America as an entry level subcompact from 1987 until 1993. Initially offered as a 2-door and 4-door sedan as well as a 2-door wagon, the wagon was discontinued in 1991 along with the 2-door for the Canadian market, the same year the 4-door sedan (as well as the 2-door, in the United States) received a mild restyling.

The Fox featured a longitudinal mounted 1.8L,  4-cylinder gasoline engine, sharing components with the Volkswagen Golf — along with a 4-speed manual transmission for the standard 2-door and 4-door sedan and a 5-speed manual transmission for the "GL" sport model — an automatic transmission was not offered. There was no power steering available. The Fox had power assisted disk brakes in the front and drums in the rear. The Fox did not have an anti-lock braking system.

According to the U.S. EPA, the 4-speed manual transmission averaged  on the new combined driving cycle with the 5-speed manual transmission able to produce  on the new driving cycle.

Early models (1987–1989) featured the Bosch CIS-E also known as KE-Jetronic electro mechanical fuel injection, using an oxygen sensor to assist in fuel management. Later models featured (1990 – 1993) Bosch Digifant electronic fuel injection. In Canada, the Fox from 1987 to 1989 was offered with the simpler Bosch CIS fuel injection (K-Jetronic) without an oxygen sensor for the engine fuel management system.

Due partly to booming sales of the Passat, Jetta, Golf and the price of the Fox compared to other manufacturers at the time, the Fox faded out fast, making it a rare car - particularly so the facelift (1990 – 1993) models. Fewer were being produced for North America due to the lack of demand. Volkswagen also priced the car very low, to compensate for the ever more expensive German-made cars, and Volkswagen of America lost money on every Fox sold in the early years.

Originally, the Fox's squared off front end featured sealed beam halogen headlamps; after 1991 models received revised sheet metal with flush glass headlamps (MK2).

South Africa
In South Africa, the Fox name was used for a model based on the first generation Jetta. This was sold alongside the Volkswagen Citi Golf, based on the first generation Golf.

Overview

Latin America
In South America the Fox was positioned between Volkswagen's supermini models, the low cost Gol and the Polo. In Mexico, it was called the Lupo, due to the last name of then current President Vicente Fox. Volkswagen of Mexico dropped the Lupo after a short run of 2009 models, due to poor sales, and replaced it along with the aged Pointer and Derby by the VW Novo Gol. The SportVan was also quietly discontinued in Mexico in February 2010 due to poor sales, leaving only the CrossFox.

In November 2009, the new 2010 Volkswagen Fox was revealed in Brazil and later also in Argentina. The model was restyled again in 2015.

Safety
The Fox in its most basic Latin American configuration received 4 stars for adult occupants and 2 stars for infants from Latin NCAP in 2015.

Europe

The Fox was introduced to Europe at the AMI Leipzig Motor Show in April 2005, on debut in Europe, the Fox was only available as a three-door hatchback and with three engine options: the 1.2 L 40 kW (55 hp) I3 and 1.4 L 55 kW (75 hp) I4 petrol engines and the 1.4 L 51 kW (69 hp) TDI engine.

The Fox was sold with a long options list to reduce its tag price, therefore letting the European customer specify the Fox to their liking. It did come with standard twin airbags and anti-lock braking system for safety measures. Upon its debut, the Fox scored four stars in EuroNCAP's crash rating system.

In the European market, the Fox replaced the Lupo city car as the entry level car in the lineup. Volkswagen stopped selling the Fox in Europe in 2011 and it has been replaced by the Volkswagen Up. Like the contemporary Polo, the Fox is based on Volkswagen's PQ24 platform.

Specifications

Variants

CrossFox/Fox Xtreme

The Volkswagen Fox Xtreme is a mini SUV version which sets it apart from the standard Fox. Before 2018 it was known as the CrossFox. As is the case for other similar models, it is available only with front-wheel drive.

It is produced in Brazil and sold in Latin American markets; there were plans to export it to European markets to compete in the expanding mini SUV market (see Ford EcoSport and Fiat Idea Adventure).

This version contains mixed-use tires and a suspension raised slightly beyond a spare tire on the outside of the trunk.

Suran
A mini MPV/station wagon version of the Fox was presented in April 2006. It is named Suran in Argentina and Uruguay, SpaceFox in Brazil and Peru, SportVan in Mexico and Fox Plus in Algeria. It is built in General Pacheco, Argentina.

Because of its 360 mm-extended tail (4,165 mm vs. 3,805 mm), it has a larger boot and more rear leg room than the hatchback versions. Its main competitors are the Peugeot 206 SW and Fiat Palio Weekend.

It was discontinued in 2019.

Safety
The Suran in its most basic Latin American configuration with 2 airbags and no ESC received 3 stars for adult occupants and 3 stars for infants from Latin NCAP in 2019 (one level above from 2010-2015).

Notes

References

External links
Official VW Brazil Fox website

Fox
Euro NCAP superminis
Latin NCAP superminis
Latin NCAP small MPVs
Cars of Brazil
Cars introduced in 2003
City cars
Hatchbacks
Front-wheel-drive vehicles
2010s cars